Serret is a surname. Notable people with the surname include:

Dulce María Serret (1898–1989), Cuban pianist and music teacher
Joseph Alfred Serret (1819–1885), French mathematician
Marie-Ernestine Serret (1812–1884), French painter and pastellist
Meritxell Serret (born 1975), Spanish politician
Virginia Serret (1914–1958), Mexican actress